Welington Adão Gomes (born 7 May 1988) is a Brazilian professional footballer who plays for Becamex Bình Dương in V.League 1 as a forward.

Career statistics

Club

References

1988 births
Living people
Brazilian footballers
Brazilian expatriate footballers
Association football forwards
Peruvian Primera División players
Peruvian Segunda División players
Wellington Adao
Tanabi Esporte Clube players
Red Bull Bragantino players
Sociedade Esportiva Palmeiras players
Coronel Bolognesi footballers
Sport Huancayo footballers
Alianza Universidad footballers
Associação Atlética Internacional (Limeira) players
Unión Huaral footballers
Brazilian expatriate sportspeople in Peru
Expatriate footballers in Peru
Brazilian expatriate sportspeople in Thailand
Expatriate footballers in Thailand
Sportspeople from Goiás